Infinity is an album by McCoy Tyner released on the Impulse! label in 1995. It was recorded in April 1995 and features performances by Tyner with tenor saxophonist Michael Brecker, bassist Avery Sharpe, drummer Aaron Scott and percussionist Valtinho Anastacio.  The album won the 1996 Grammy for Best Jazz Instrumental Performance (Individual or Group), while Michael Brecker won the Grammy for Best Jazz Instrumental Solo for the track "Impressions".

Reception
The AllMusic review by Scott Yanow states that "There are not a lot of surprises on this quartet matchup  except perhaps for how well Tyner and Brecker mesh together... Brecker's presence and consistently powerful playing does inspire Tyner and his sidemen. For a strong example as to why today's saxophonists have such a high opinion of Michael Brecker, his roaring statement on the extended "Impressions" will suffice. Highly recommended".

Track listing
All compositions by McCoy Tyner except where noted.
 "Flying High" - 10:14  
 "I Mean You" (Hawkins, Monk) - 7:19  
 "Where Is Love" - 5:31  
 "Changes" - 9:46  
 "Blues Stride" - 3:38  
 "Happy Days" - 9:42  
 "Impressions" (Coltrane) - 11:13  
 "Mellow Minor" - 9:21  
 "Good Morning Heartache" (Drake, Fisher, Higginbotham) - 5:26 

Recorded at Rudy Van Gelder Studio, Englewood Cliffs, NJ, April 12 (track 1 & 6), 13 (tracks 4, 7 & 8) and 14 (tracks 2, 3, 5 & 9), 1995

Personnel
McCoy Tyner – piano
Michael Brecker – tenor saxophone
Avery Sharpe – bass
Aaron Scott – drums 
Valtinho Anastacio– congas, percussion

References

McCoy Tyner albums
1995 albums
Impulse! Records albums
Albums recorded at Van Gelder Studio
Grammy Award for Best Jazz Instrumental Album
Albums produced by Michael Cuscuna